William O'Neill (often also referred to as "Billy") was a footballer for Dundalk F.C. and an Irish international, who played as a defender.

O'Neill was capped eleven times for the Irish Free State at senior level. His debut was in a 5–3 home defeat to Netherlands in December 1935. with his final cap coming in a 1–1 draw away to Germany in 1939.

References

External links
Profile from soccerscene.ie
Profile from Dundalk FC Who's Who

Republic of Ireland association footballers
Irish Free State association footballers
Irish Free State international footballers
Dundalk F.C. players
Ireland (FAI) international footballers
Association football defenders
1916 births
1978 deaths